Miguel Albiol Tortajada (born 2 September 1981) is a Spanish former footballer who played mainly as a right midfielder.

In a 16-year professional career, he amassed Segunda División totals of 178 matches and two goals over seven seasons, in representation of three clubs. In La Liga, he appeared for Valencia.

Club career
Born in Vilamarxant, Valencian Community, Albiol was a product of hometown Valencia CF's youth ranks as younger brother Raúl after him, and played once with its first team, during 2002–03's La Liga. He finished that season in the second division with Real Murcia, featuring regularly en route to the club's promotion.

Released by the Che, Albiol spent a further year with Recreativo de Huelva (also second tier), then had a steady period with Rayo Vallecano. He was instrumental in the latter side's 2008 promotion to division two, after four consecutive playoff failures.

In July 2009, apparently after having everything arranged with Hércules CF, Albiol agreed on a return move to Murcia, signing for three years. He appeared in 30 games in his first season – 22 starts, 2,200 minutes of play – which ended in second-division relegation.

Personal life
Albiol's younger brother, Raúl, was also a footballer. He represented with success Valencia, Real Madrid, S.S.C. Napoli, Villarreal CF and the Spain national team.

References

External links

CiberChe stats and bio 

1981 births
Living people
People from Camp de Túria
Sportspeople from the Province of Valencia
Spanish footballers
Association football midfielders
La Liga players
Segunda División players
Segunda División B players
Valencia CF Mestalla footballers
Valencia CF players
Real Murcia players
Recreativo de Huelva players
Rayo Vallecano players
Spain youth international footballers
Spain under-21 international footballers